Mae Busch (born Annie May Busch; 18 June 1891 – 20 April 1946) was an Australian-born actress who worked in both silent and sound films in early Hollywood. In the latter part of her career she appeared in many Laurel and Hardy comedies, frequently playing Hardy's shrewish wife.

Early life and career 

Busch was born in Melbourne, Victoria to popular Australian vaudeville performers Elizabeth Maria Lay and Frederick William Busch. Her mother had been active since 1883 under the stage names Dora Devere and then Dora Busch; she toured India with Hudson's Surprise Party and toured New Zealand twice. They continued to tour with various companies with short breaks when their two children were born, Dorothy in 1889 (who lived for only four months) and Annie May in 1891. Following a concert tour of New Zealand, the family left for the United States via Tahiti. They departed on 8 August 1896 and arrived in San Francisco at the end of 1896 or in early 1897.

While her parents were touring the United States, six-year-old Annie May was placed in a convent school in New Jersey. At the age of 12, she joined her parents as the Busch Devere Trio, which was active from 1903 until 1912. As Mae Busch she performed with her mother in Guy Fletch Bragdon's "The Fixer" to good reviews, and in 1911 they featured in Tom Reeves' "Big Show Burlesque". Mae's big break came in March 1912 when she replaced Lillian Lorraine as the lead female in "Over the River" with Eddie Foy.

Mae's first film appearances are reputed to be in The Agitator and The Water Nymph, both released in 1912. There is some doubt about Mae's being in these films, though, as the production of both films in California appears to clash with Busch's commitments in New York. In 1915 she began working at Keystone Studios, where she appeared in comedy two-reelers. Her dalliance with studio chief Mack Sennett famously ended his engagement to actress Mabel Normand—who had actually been Busch's mentor and friend—when Normand walked in on the pair. According to Minta Durfee's unverifiable claim, Busch, who was known for pinpoint throwing accuracy, inflicted a serious head injury on Normand by striking her with a vase.

At the pinnacle of her film career, Busch was known as the versatile vamp. She starred in such feature films as The Devil's Pass Key (1920) and Foolish Wives (1923), both directed by Erich von Stroheim, and in The Unholy Three (1925), with Lon Chaney. She soon walked out on her contract at Metro–Goldwyn–Mayer and suffered a nervous breakdown. She regained her health and resumed working at both major and minor studios; her best opportunity was a starring role in Universal's 1927 drama Perch of the Devil, with Busch cast against type as a sympathetic young bride confronted by a rival. The film's climax was a spectacular flood sequence; this footage from Perch of the Devil was reused in later Universal productions for more than a decade.

In 1926, producer Hal Roach began casting "name" dramatic stars in his short comedies: Priscilla Dean, Theda Bara, Herbert Rawlinson, Agnes Ayres, and Lionel Barrymore among them. Mae Busch joined Roach's "All Stars" for a leading role in Love 'em and Weep (1927), which began her long association with Laurel and Hardy. The short received good distribution and resulted in Busch resuming her feature-film career, including a return to MGM for the 1928 Lon Chaney feature While the City Sleeps.

In 1929, many stars of silent films faced an uncertain future, with their talents less in demand as talking pictures caught on. When a short-subject assignment came along, Busch grabbed it. It was again for the Hal Roach studio, in the Laurel & Hardy comedy Unaccustomed as We Are (1929). It was the team's first "all-talking" comedy, and stage-trained Mae Busch handled her dialogue well as Hardy's put-upon wife. She went on to appear in 12 more Laurel and Hardy comedies, often displaying her versatility. She alternated between shrewish, gold-digging floozies (Chickens Come Home, Come Clean), Oliver Hardy's volatile wife (Sons of the Desert, Their First Mistake), and more sympathetic roles (Them Thar Hills, Tit for Tat, The Fixer Uppers). Her last role in a Laurel and Hardy film was in The Bohemian Girl, again as a combative spouse of Hardy's, released in 1936.

That same year she was featured in a low-budget serial, The Clutching Hand, but it did not advance her career. From then on, her film roles were often uncredited. Overall, she had roles in approximately 130 motion pictures between 1912 and 1946. Jackie Gleason later mentioned her name on his TV show as "the ever-popular Mae Busch".

In 2014 The Grim Game, the believed-lost 1919 film that was the first feature to star Harry Houdini, was discovered and restored by Rick Schmidlin for Turner Classic Movies. Busch appears, credited as Bush.

Personal life and death 

Busch was married three times: to actor Francis McDonald (1915–22), to John Earl Cassell (1926–29), and to civil engineer Thomas C. Tate (1936–her death).

Busch died on 20 April 1946, age 54, at a San Fernando Valley sanitarium where she had been ill for five months with colon cancer.

For her contributions to the film industry, Busch was inducted into the Hollywood Walk of Fame in 1960 with a motion pictures star located at 7021 Hollywood Boulevard.

In the 1970s it was discovered that her ashes had remained unclaimed; the Way Out West Tent, a chapter of The Sons of the Desert (the international Laurel and Hardy appreciation society), paid for their interment at Chapel of the Pines Crematory. The memorial plaque is incorrectly dated 1901.

Selected filmography

References 
Citations

Bibliography

External links 

 
 
 
 Mae Busch at Virtual History
 Mae Busch at the Way Out West Tent

Actresses from Melbourne
Australian expatriate actresses in the United States
Australian film actresses
Australian silent film actresses
Australian stage actresses
Hal Roach Studios actors
People from the San Fernando Valley
Deaths from cancer in California
Deaths from colorectal cancer
Vaudeville performers
1891 births
1946 deaths
Burials at Chapel of the Pines Crematory
20th-century Australian actresses
19th-century Australian women